, 18th Marquess Hachisuka, was a Japanese ornithologist and aviculturist.

Biography

He was the great grandson of the 11th shōgun Tokugawa Ienari and also nephew of the last shōgun Prince Tokugawa, Hachisuka was born in Tokyo in 1903. He moved to England at the age of nineteen to complete his education and studied zoology for five years at Magdalene College, Cambridge, where his interest in birds grew considerably, much at the encouragement of Dr. Guillemard and A. H. Evans, culminating in his inclusion at the British Ornithologists' Union.
 
Hachisuka went to expeditions in Iceland (1925), North Africa (1927) and also Belgian Congo. After graduating in Cambridge in 1927, he returned to Japan, travelling via the United States along Jean Delacour, with whom he visited China and Korea later. In 1928–9, he went to the Philippine Islands to study the distribution of the local avifauna. The study was published in 1932–3 in the two-volume set "Birds of the Philippine Islands" after returning to London and working his collection at the British Museum and at Tring. He also wrote extensively on the birds of Egypt, Iceland, Hainan and Formosa.

Although he intended to return to Japan after his father's death, as he was needed to take up his position as head of the family, an illness forced him to remain in California until 1938. There, he married Chiyeko Nagamine, who was from Los Angeles, on March 7, 1939; the couple had a daughter.

After the war he worked on an account of the birds of the Mascarenes Islands.  He died after a brief illness in 1953 in Atami, Japan, and his work was published posthumously (The Dodo and Kindred Birds). He was also working on a book about the birds of China when he died.

Ancestry

References

1903 births
1953 deaths
Alumni of Magdalene College, Cambridge
Hachisuka clan
20th-century Japanese zoologists
Japanese ornithologists
Scientists from Tokyo